The Bavarian B VI steam engines were  locomotives with the Royal Bavarian State Railways (Königlich Bayerische Staatsbahn).

This class was a development of the B V; its dimensions, heating area and grate area being almost the same, only the driving wheel diameter being larger. It was built in two series.

Series 1 delivered 57 locomotives in four batches which had a boiler overpressure of 8 bar. The first two batches, delivered in 1863 and 1864, had a large goblet-shaped smokestack and open driver's platform with a windshield. Batches 3 and 4, delivered from 1865 to 1867 added a roof over the driver's platform; the smokestacks were now cylindrical or pear-shaped and an injector and pump for the feedwater.

On the second series of five batches, the boiler overpressure was raised to 10 bar. The first two batches (delivered 1867 - 1869), unusually, were peat-fired and hauled a covered peat tender. The first batch had side windows on the driver's cab and cylindrical or funnel-shaped chimneys. The second batch (see illustration of ORLANDO DI LASSO) lost the side windows again. Batches three and four, delivered in 1870, were a mix of peat-fired engines with funnel smokestacks and coal-fired engines with conical chimneys. The final batch of 6 engines, delivered in 1871, were peat-fired with funnel smokestacks and no side windows and rounded corners to the cabs.

The last two examples remaining in service (422 WREDE and 432 MARKTL) were transferred to the ownership of the Reichsbahn in 1920 and were listed in the DRG's 1923 provisional renumbering plan as nos. 34 7461 and 34 7462. However the renumbering was never carried out because they had retired by 1923.

They were coupled to Bavarian 3 T 9 and 3 T 9.6 tenders.

See also 
Royal Bavarian State Railways
 List of Bavarian locomotives and railbuses

References

Sources

External links 
 Railways of Germany forum

2-4-0 locomotives
B 06
Maffei locomotives
Standard gauge locomotives of Germany
Railway locomotives introduced in 1863
1B n2 locomotives
Passenger locomotives